Artistic gymnastics, for the 2013 Island Games, took place at the National Training Centre, instead of the Warwick Academy. Competition occurred on the 14, 16, and 18 July 2013.

Medal table
 2013 Island Games Gymnastics Medal Tally

Medal summary

Men's FIG events

Men's SET events

Women's FIG events

Women's SET events

References

Island Games
Gymnastics
2013